The 12' Dinghy was a sailing event on the Sailing at the 1920 Summer Olympics program in Ostend and Amsterdam. Four races were scheduled. 5 sailors, on 2 boats, from 1 nation entered.

Race schedule

Course area

Weather conditions

Final results 
The 1920 Olympic scoring system was used. All competitors were male.

Daily standings

Notes 
 This was the first Olympic event ever, and the only Olympic sailing event that was held outside the organizing country.
 During race No. II one of the marks was drifting the race was cancelled (Nullified). Since the organizers did not have the time to re-sail the race that week the two remaining races were rescheduled for September 3. Because both contenders were Dutch, the organizers requested the Dutch Olympic Committee to organize the race in Amsterdam Buiten Y.
 Cornelis Hin helmed in race No. I and the cancelled race No. II, Frans Hin helmed the two races in Amsterdam.

Other information

Sailors
During the Sailing regattas at the 1920 Summer Olympics among others the following persons were competing in the various classes:

Further reading

References 

12' Dinghy
12 foot dinghy